Ally Maclay (born 2 March 1984 in Glasgow, Scotland) is a Hong Kong international rugby union footballer. He plays at centre. He plays for Glasgow Hawks.

Rugby Union career

Amateur career

Maclay started out playing with the Glasgow Hawks at midi level. He then played with  Stewart's Melville, while he was a PE student at Edinburgh. He returned to Hawks and won the Championship and Cup double in 2003-04 season. He also played for Sydney University and in Hong Kong with Valley rugby club. Maclay came back to play with the Glasgow Hawks from 2013.

Professional career

Maclay was in the Glasgow Warriors back-up squad for the 2004-05 season. He played in the Warriors match against Newcastle Falcons on 20 September 2004 at Hughenden Stadium scoring a try in this match in a 26 - 21 victory for the Glasgow side.

Maclay was later to play against the Warriors when he played for Glasgow Hawks. In a friendly match on 20 March 2007, he scored a try against the Warriors in a 14-14 draw at Old Anniesland.

International career

Maclay came through the age-grades for Scotland playing at U16, U18, U19 and U21 grades. He moved to Hong Kong where he became eligible and represented both the Hong Kong national side and the Hong Kong 7s national side.

Assault

Maclay was the victim of an assault which ended up in the Scottish court and made various newspaper headlines. A Halloween night-out with the Glasgow Hawks and Glasgow Warriors players in October 2013 ended in a takeaway restaurant.

Being Halloween, the rugby stars were in fancy dress. Maclay, dressed as Tweedledee, interjected in a dispute between fellow Hawks player Gavin Quinn and Warriors and Scotland international Ryan Wilson.

Wilson was fined £750 for assaulting both Quinn and Maclay by the Glasgow Sheriff Court.

References

1984 births
Living people
Rugby union centres
Scottish rugby union players
Hong Kong international rugby union players
Glasgow Warriors players
Hong Kong rugby union players
Stewart's Melville RFC players
Glasgow Hawks players
Hong Kong international rugby sevens players
Valley RFC players
Rugby union players from Glasgow
Scottish expatriate sportspeople in Hong Kong
Scottish expatriate sportspeople in Australia
Scottish expatriate rugby union players
Expatriate rugby union players in Australia
Expatriate rugby union players in Hong Kong
Naturalised citizens of the People's Republic of China in Hong Kong
Naturalised sports competitors